Hlíðarendi is a multi-purpose stadium in Reykjavík, Iceland. It is the home-court of Valur's football, basketball and handball teams. The football stadium holds 2,465 people, including 1,201 in seats. The indoor court holds 1,300 people in seats.

The stadium broke ground in 2004 and the indoor stadium was formerly opened on 7 September 2007 while the outdoor football stadium was formerly opened on 25 May 2008. It bore the name of Vodafone from 2007 until 2015. In June 2018 the club signed a five-year sponsorship deal with Origo which saw the football stadium being renamed Origovöllurinn and the handball/basketball stadium being renamed Origo-höllin (Origo arena).

External links
 Stadium photos and video - Nordic Stadiums

References

Football venues in Iceland
Multi-purpose stadiums in Iceland
Valur (club)
Sports venues in Reykjavík
Basketball venues in Iceland